"Forever Young" is a song by Bob Dylan, recorded in California in November 1973. The song first appeared, in two different versions, a slow-pace and a fast-pace, on Dylan's fourteenth studio album Planet Waves.

A demo version of the song, recorded in New York City in June 1973, was included on Dylan's 1985 compilation Biograph. In the notes included with that album, Dylan is quoted as saying that he wrote "Forever Young" in Tucson, Arizona, "thinking about" one of his sons and "not wanting to be too sentimental".

A live version of the song, recorded in Tokyo on 28 February 1978 and included on Dylan's album Bob Dylan at Budokan, was released as a European single in 1979.

Analysis
Written as a lullaby for his eldest son Jesse, born in 1966, Dylan's song relates a father's hopes that his child will remain strong and happy. It opens with the lines, 'May God bless and keep you always / May your wishes all come true', echoing the priestly blessing from the Book of Numbers, which has lines that begin: 'May the Lord bless you and guard you / May the Lord make His face shed light upon you.'  Not wishing to sound 'too sentimental', Dylan included two versions of the song on the album Planet Waves, one a lullaby and the other more rock-oriented.

In notes on "Forever Young" written for the 2007 album Dylan, Bill Flanagan writes that Dylan and the Band 'got together and quickly knocked off an album, Planet Waves, that featured two versions of a blessing from a parent to a child. In the years he was away from stage, Dylan had become a father. He had that in common with a good chunk of the audience. The song was memorably recited on American television by Howard Cosell when Muhammad Ali won the heavyweight crown for the third time'.

Personnel
 Bob Dylan – guitar, piano, harmonica, vocals
 Rick Danko – bass guitar
 Levon Helm – drums
 Garth Hudson – organ
 Richard Manuel – piano, drums
 Robbie Robertson – guitars

In live performance
According to his website, Dylan performed the song live 493 times between its live debut in 1974 and its last outing in 2011. This includes a duet with Bruce Springsteen at the Concert for the Rock and Roll Hall of Fame in Cleveland, OH in 1995. Dylan also performed the song live on the Late Show with David Letterman in 1993.

Rod Stewart version
Rod Stewart recorded a song titled "Forever Young" that was released as a single and included on his 1988 album Out of Order. Stewart's manager, Arnold Stiefel, said, "[I]t would be fair to say that while the melody and the music is not at all the same [as Dylan's song], the idea of the song is similar. The architecture of the lyrics of the song is very much from Dylan–there are definite similarities." The similarities were enough to cause Stiefel to contact Dylan, who requested a share of the royalties, and Stewart agreed. His version charted at #12 on the Billboard Hot 100 in the US, while it made #57 in the UK Singles Chart on its release in 1988, and #55 on re-release in 2013.

Joan Baez version
In 1974 Joan Baez covered Forever Young as a single. It reached 13 on the US charts.

Louisa Johnson version

In December 2015, Louisa Johnson, the winner of the twelfth series of The X Factor, released a cover version of "Forever Young" as her winner's single. It was released on December 13, 2015, immediately after Johnson won. Johnson performed the song live on The X Factor final. She also performed it on Text Santa. Johnson's version entered the UK Singles Chart on December 18 at number nine, and was the first X Factor winner single not to reach number one. The song has sold 99,648 copies in the UK as of June 2016.

Track listing

Chart performance

Release history

Parenthood 
Dylan lent his name, voice, and song as the theme to the television show Parenthood. Lucy Schwartz sang "When We Were Young" in seasons 3–6 internationally. On August 31, 2010, Arrival Records/Scion Music Group released a soundtrack for Parenthood. The soundtrack includes both theme songs for Parenthood, "Forever Young" by Bob Dylan, and the international theme, "When We Were Young" by Lucy Schwartz. It also includes a cover of "Forever Young" performed by John Doe and Lucy Schwartz. Rhiannon Giddens and Iron & Wine covered "Forever Young" for the show's final episode on January 29, 2015.

Children's Book 
The lyrics to “Forever Young” were published as a children's book along with illustrations by illustrator Paul Rogers. Rogers's visual interpretation of “Forever Young” includes references to Bob Dylan's life and livelihood juxtaposed against the backdrop of the social and political climate.

References

External links
Lyrics at Bob Dylan's official site

1974 songs
1979 singles
Bob Dylan songs
Song recordings produced by Rob Fraboni
Songs written by Bob Dylan
Syco Music singles
Sony Music UK singles
Columbia Records singles
CBS Records singles
2015 singles
Louisa Johnson songs
Peter, Paul and Mary songs
Song recordings produced by Julian Bunetta
Joan Baez songs
Meat Loaf songs
The Band songs
Songs about children